The Extraordinary and Plenipotentiary Ambassador of Peru to the Italian Republic is the official representative of the Republic of Peru to the Italian Republic.

It is customary for the ambassador to represent Peru before the Food and Agriculture Organization of the United Nations (FAO) due to the headquarters of this body in Rome; as well as organizations such as the International Fund for Agricultural Development (IFAD) and before the World Food Program (WFP). The Peruvian ambassador in Rome also acts as concurrent ambassador for San Marino and Cyprus, as well as Malta as of December 2022.

Both countries established bilateral relations on the 23rd of December, 1874, with Peru having previously established relations with the Holy See in 1852 before the unification of Italy. Today, around 500,000–900,000 Peruvians of Italian descent live in the country, most notably in Lima.

List of representatives

See also
List of ambassadors of Peru to the Holy See

References

Peruvian diplomats
Ambassadors of Peru
Italy
Peru
Ambassadors of Peru to Italy